Fahud is a permanent oil camp and oil field in the middle of the central plain area of Oman, named after the nearby Jebel Fahud believed to mean "Leopard Mountain" from the time when wild leopards roamed the area. The main oil camp is owned by Petroleum Development Oman (PDO), the national oil company. 

Oil operations commenced in 1954 when a PDO survey party arrived at the jebel and began surveying it. The first well at Jebel Fahud was completed at 12,235 feet in May 1957. Unfortunately, it was a dry hole except for a very small quantity of gas and oil.
Three of the PDO partners decided to withdraw from the Omani concession, leaving Shell (85%) and Partex (15%) to take it over and resume exploration. Only a few hundred yards from the original test well site, a second test well was sunk at Fahud and, in 1964, found oil in commercial quantities. 

Today, Fahud is the central base of PDO's operations in the interior of Oman; the company's main offices are in Mina Al Fahal in Muscat. Many contracting companies also have camps for their workers and equipment at Fahud. Some meteorological data: 1 June 2008 at 15 pm local hour it was recorded 54.5 degrees Celsius, a new record for Fahud.

The town is served by Fahud Airport.

References

Economy of Oman